The 2020 AFC Futsal Championship qualification was the qualification process organized by the Asian Football Confederation (AFC) to determine the participating teams for the 2020 AFC Futsal Championship, the 16th edition of the international men's futsal championship of Asia.

A total of 16 teams qualified to play in the final tournament, including Turkmenistan who automatically qualified as original hosts (tournament was later relocated to Kuwait before being cancelled).

The qualification process was divided into four zones: ASEAN Zone, where the 2019 AFF Futsal Championship served as the qualifying competition, Central & South Zone (Nepal being the only team from South Zone entering), East Zone, and West Zone.

Qualification process
Of the 47 AFC member associations, a total of 31 teams entered the competition. Based on the teams’ performance of 2018 AFC Futsal Championship, the 16 spots in the final tournament were distributed as follows:
Host: 1 spot
ASEAN Zone: 3 spots
Central & South Zone: 4 spots
East Zone: 3 spots
West Zone: 5 spots

Draw
In each zone, the teams were seeded according to their performance in the 2018 AFC Futsal Championship final tournament and qualification (overall ranking shown in parentheses; NR stands for non-ranked teams).

The draw for the 2019 AFF Futsal Championship, which served as the ASEAN Zone qualifying competition, was held by the AFF in July 2019. The eight teams were drawn into two groups of four teams.

The draw for the Central & South Zone, East Zone and West Zone, was held on 25 July 2019, 15:00 MYT (UTC+8), at the AFC House in Kuala Lumpur, Malaysia.

In the Central & South Zone, the seven teams were drawn into two groups: one group of four teams and one group of three teams. Turkmenistan also entered the qualifying competition despite having automatically qualified for the final tournament.

In the East Zone, the seven teams were drawn into two groups: one group of four teams and one group of three teams.

In the West Zone, the nine teams were drawn into two groups: one group of five teams and one group of four teams.

Notes
Teams in bold qualified for the final tournament.

Format
In each group, teams played each other once at a centralised venue.

Tiebreakers
Teams are ranked according to points (3 points for a win, 1 point for a draw, 0 points for a loss), and if tied on points, the following tiebreaking criteria are applied, in the order given, to determine the rankings (Regulations Article 10.5):
Points in head-to-head matches among tied teams;
Goal difference in head-to-head matches among tied teams;
Goals scored in head-to-head matches among tied teams;
If more than two teams are tied, and after applying all head-to-head criteria above, a subset of teams are still tied, all head-to-head criteria above are reapplied exclusively to this subset of teams;
Goal difference in all group matches;
Goals scored in all group matches;
Penalty shoot-out if only two teams are tied and they met in the last round of the group;
Disciplinary points (yellow card = 1 point, red card as a result of two yellow cards = 3 points, direct red card = 3 points, yellow card followed by direct red card = 4 points);
Drawing of lots.

ASEAN Zone

Top three teams of the tournament qualified for 2020 AFC Futsal Championship.
The matches were played between 21 and 27 October 2019.
All matches were held in Vietnam.
Times listed are UTC+7.

Group A

Group B

Semi-finals
The winners qualified for 2020 AFC Futsal Championship.

Third place match
The winner qualified for 2020 AFC Futsal Championship.

Final

Central & South Zone
Top two teams of each group qualified for 2020 AFC Futsal Championship. Had Turkmenistan occupied one of the qualifying spots, the best third-placed team from the two groups would also have qualified.
The matches were played between 23 and 25 October 2019.
All matches were held in Iran.
Times listed are UTC+3:30.

Group A

Group B

East Zone
Winners of each group, and the winner of the play-off between the group runners-up, qualified for 2020 AFC Futsal Championship.
The matches were played between 22 and 26 October 2019.
All matches were held in China.
Times listed are UTC+8.

Group A

Group B

Play-off
The winner qualified for 2020 AFC Futsal Championship.

West Zone
Top two teams of each group, and the winner of the play-off between the group third-placed team, qualified for 2020 AFC Futsal Championship.
The matches were played between 16 and 22 October 2019.
All matches were held in Bahrain.
Times listed are UTC+3.

Group A

Group B

Play-off
The winner qualified for 2020 AFC Futsal Championship.

Qualified teams
The following 16 teams qualified for the final tournament.

1 Bold indicates champions for that year. Italic indicates hosts for that year.

Goalscorers

References

External links
, the-AFC.com
AFC Futsal Championship 2020, stats.the-AFC.com

Qualification
2020
qualification
October 2019 sports events in Asia